The Skatestraum Tunnel is a subsea road tunnel between the islands of Rugsundøya and Bremangerlandet in Bremanger Municipality in Vestland county, Norway. The tunnel was the first undersea road tunnel in Sogn og Fjordane county when it was built.

It is part of County Road 616. It opened on 12 July 2002 and cost  to build, including auxiliary roads.

On 15 July 2015 a tank truck crashed in the tunnel. The tunnel was closed and evacuated,  since there was a risk the tunnel would be flooded. It was reopened in December 2015.

References

Bremanger
Road tunnels in Vestland
Subsea tunnels in Norway
Tunnels completed in 2002
2002 establishments in Norway